Wong Kar-wai  (born 17 July 1958) is a Hong Kong film director, screenwriter, and producer. His films are characterised by nonlinear narratives, atmospheric music, and vivid cinematography involving bold, saturated colours. A pivotal figure of Hong Kong cinema, Wong is considered a contemporary auteur, and ranks third on Sight & Sounds 2002 poll of the greatest filmmakers of the previous 25 years. His films frequently appear on best-of lists domestically and internationally.

Born in Shanghai, Wong emigrated to British Hong Kong as a child with his family. He began a career as a screenwriter for soap operas before transitioning to directing with his debut, the crime drama As Tears Go By (1988). While As Tears Go By was fairly successful in Hong Kong, Wong moved away from the contemporary trend of crime and action movies to embark on more personal filmmaking styles. Days of Being Wild (1990), his first venture in such a direction, did not perform well at the box office. It however received critical acclaim, and won Best Film and Best Director at the 1991 Hong Kong Film Awards. His next film, Ashes of Time (1994), met with a mixed reception because of its vague plot and atypical take on the  genre.

Exhausted by the time-consuming filming and post-production of Ashes of Time, Wong directed Chungking Express (1994), a smaller film that he hoped would rekindle his love of cinema. The film, expressing a more lighthearted atmosphere, catapulted Wong to international prominence, and won Best Film and Best Director at the 1995 Hong Kong Film Awards. Wong followed up with the crime thriller Fallen Angels in 1995. Although it was initially tepidly received by critics, Fallen Angels has since come to be considered a cult classic of the Golden Age of Hong Kong cinema, being especially representative of Wong’s style. Wong would go on to consolidate his worldwide reputation with the 1997 drama Happy Together, for which he won Best Director at the Cannes Film Festival.

The 2000 drama In the Mood for Love, revered for its lush visuals and subtle storytelling, concretely established Wong's trademark filmmaking styles. Among his other work are 2046 (2004) and The Grandmaster (2013), both of which received awards and nominations worldwide.

Early life

Wong Kar-wai was born on 17 July 1958 in Shanghai, the youngest of three siblings. His father was a sailor and his mother was a housewife. By the time Wong was five years old, the seeds of the Cultural Revolution were beginning to take effect in China and his parents decided to relocate to British-ruled Hong Kong. The two older children were meant to join them later, but the borders closed before they had a chance and Wong did not see his brother or sister again for ten years. In Hong Kong, the family settled in Tsim Sha Tsui, and his father got work managing a night club. Being an only child in a new city, Wong has said he felt isolated during his childhood; he struggled to learn Cantonese and English, only becoming fluent in these new languages when he was a teenager.

As a youth, Wong was frequently taken to the cinema by his mother and exposed to a variety of films. He later said: "The only hobby I had as a child was watching movies". At school he was interested in graphic design, and earned a diploma in the subject from Hong Kong Polytechnic in 1980. After graduating, Wong was accepted onto a training course with the TVB television network, where he learned the processes of media production.

Career

Beginnings (1980–1989)
He soon began a screenwriting career, firstly with TV series and soap operas, such as Don't Look Now (1981), before progressing to film scripts. He worked as part of a team, contributing to a variety of genres including romance, comedy, thriller, and crime. Wong had little enthusiasm for these early projects, described by the film scholar Gary Bettinson as "occasionally diverting and mostly disposable", but continued to write throughout the 1980s on films including Just for Fun (1983), Rosa (1986), and The Haunted Cop Shop of Horrors (1987). He is credited with ten screenplays between 1982 and 1987, but claims to have worked on about fifty more without official credit. Wong spent two years writing the screenplay for Patrick Tam's action film Final Victory (1987), for which he was nominated at the 7th Hong Kong Film Awards.

By 1987 the Hong Kong film industry was at a peak, enjoying a considerable level of prosperity and productivity. New directors were needed to maintain this success, and – through his links in the industry – Wong was invited to become a partner on a new independent company, In-Gear, and given the opportunity to direct his own picture. Gangster films were popular at the time, in the wake of John Woo's highly-successful A Better Tomorrow (1986), and Wong decided to follow suit. Specifically, unlike Hong Kong's other crime films, he chose to focus on young gangsters. The film, named As Tears Go By, tells the story of a conflicted youth who has to watch over his hot-headed friend.

Because he was well acquainted with the producer, Alan Tang, Wong was given considerable freedom in the making of As Tears Go By. His cast included what he considered some of "the hottest young idols in Hong Kong": singer Andy Lau, Maggie Cheung, and Jacky Cheung. As Tears Go By was released in June 1988 and was popular with audiences. Several journalists named Wong among the "Hong Kong New Wave". While it was a conventional crime film, critic David Bordwell said that Wong "[stood] out from his peers by abandoning the kinetics of comedies and action movies in favour of more liquid atmospherics." As Tears Go By received no attention from Western critics upon its initial release, but it was selected to be screened during the Directors' Fortnight of the 1989 Cannes Film Festival.

Developing style (1990–1994)

For his next film, Wong decided to move away from the crime trend in Hong Kong cinema, to which he felt indifferent. He was eager to make something unique, and the financial success of As Tears Go By made this possible. Developing a more personal project than his previous film, Wong picked the 1960s as a setting – evoking an era that he remembered well and had a "special feeling" for. Days of Being Wild focuses on a disillusioned young adult named Yuddy and those around him. There is no straightforward plot or obvious genre, but Stephen Teo sees it as a film about the "longing for love". Andy Lau, Maggie Cheung, and Jacky Cheung rejoined Wong for his second film, while Leslie Cheung was cast in the central role. Hired as cinematographer was Christopher Doyle, who became one of Wong's most important collaborators, photographing his next six films.

With its popular stars, Days of Being Wild was expected to be a mainstream picture; instead it was a character piece, more concerned with mood and atmosphere than narrative. Released in December 1990, the film earned little at the box office and divided critics. Despite this, it won five Hong Kong Film Awards, and received some attention internationally. With its experimental narrative, expressive camerawork, and themes of lost time and love, Days of Being Wild is described by film critic Peter Brunette as the first typical "Wong Kar-wai film". It has since gained a reputation as one of Hong Kong's finest releases. Its initial failure was disheartening for the director, and he could not gain funding for his next project – a planned sequel.

Struggling to get support for his work, Wong formed his own production company, Jet Tone Films, with Jeff Lau in 1992. Wong was enthusiastic about the idea, claiming he had long wanted to make a costume drama. He eventually took little from the book other than three characters, and in 1992 began experimenting with several different narrative structures to weave what he called "a very complex tapestry". Filming began with another all-star cast: Leslie, Maggie, and Jacky Cheung returned alongside Brigitte Lin, Carina Lau, Charlie Young, and Tony Leung Chiu-wai − the latter of which became one of Wong's key collaborators.

Set during the Song dynasty, Ashes of Time concerns a desert-exiled assassin who is called upon by several different characters while nursing a broken heart. It was a difficult production and the project was not completed for two years, at a cost of HK$47 million. The film scholar Martha P. Nochimson has called it "the most unusual martial arts film ever made", as fast-paced action scenes are replaced with character ruminations, and story becomes secondary to the use of colour, landscape, and imagery. As such, Ashes of Time was a commercial failure, but critics were generally appreciative of Wong's "refusal to be loyal to [the ] genre". The film won several local awards, and competed at the Venice Film Festival where Doyle won Best Cinematography. In 2008, Wong reworked the film and re-released it as Ashes of Time Redux.

Breakthrough (1994–1995)

During the long production of Ashes of Time, Wong faced a two-month break as he waited for equipment to re-record sound for some scenes. He was in a negative state, feeling heavy pressure from his backers and worrying about another failure, and so decided to start a new project: "I thought I should do something to make myself feel comfortable about making films again. So I made Chungking Express, which I made like a student film." Conceived and completed within only six weeks, the new project ended up being released two months before Ashes of Time.

Chungking Express is split into two distinct parts – both set in contemporary Hong Kong and focusing on lonely policemen (Takeshi Kaneshiro and Tony Leung Chiu-wai) who each fall for a woman (Brigitte Lin and Faye Wong). Wong was keen to experiment with "two crisscrossing stories in one movie" and worked spontaneously, filming at night what he had written that day. Peter Brunette notes that Chungking is considerably more fun and lighthearted than the director's previous efforts, but deals with the same themes. At the 1995 Hong Kong Film Awards it was named Best Picture, and Wong received Best Director. Miramax acquired the film for American distribution, which, according to Brunette, "catapulted Wong to international attention". Stephen Schneider includes it in his book 1001 Movies You Must See Before You Die with the summary: "While other films by Wong may pack more emotional resonance, Chungking Express gets off on sheer innocence, exuberance, and cinematic freedom, a striking triumph of style over substance".

Wong continued to work without break, expanding his ideas from Chungking Express into another film about alienated young adults in contemporary Hong Kong. Chungking Express had originally been conceived as three stories, but when time ran out, Wong developed the third as a new project, Fallen Angels, with new characters. Wong conceived both films as complementary studies of Hong Kong: "To me Chungking Express and Fallen Angels are one film that should be three hours long."

Fallen Angels is broadly considered a crime thriller, and contains scenes of extreme violence, but is atypical of the genre and heavily infused with Wong's fragmented, experimental style. The loose plot again involves two distinct, subtly overlapping narratives, and is dominated by frantic visuals. The film mostly occurs at night and explores the dark side of Hong Kong, which Wong planned intentionally to balance the sweetness of Chungking: "It's fair to show both sides of a coin". Takeshi Kaneshiro and Charlie Young were cast again, but new to Wong's films were Leon Lai, Michelle Reis and Karen Mok. Upon release in September 1995, several critics felt that the film was too similar to Chungking Express and some complained that Wong had become self-indulgent. However, as time went on, critics would go on to have a significant re-appraisal of the film, and it has amassed a large cult following, becoming one of Wong’s most popular and iconic films. Fallen Angels has often been stated as one of the director’s most stylish films, and it has also been received with praise for its non-conventional, fragmented plot. Film historians Zhang Yingjin and Xiao Zhiwei commented: "While not as groundbreaking as its predecessors, the film is still different and innovative enough to confirm [Wong's] presence on the international scene."

Widespread recognition (1996–2000)

While his reputation grew steadily throughout the early 1990s, Wong's international standing was "thoroughly consolidated" with the 1997 romantic drama Happy Together (1997). Its development was influenced by the handover of Hong Kong from Britain to China, which occurred that year. Wong was widely expected to address the event in his next film; instead, he avoided the pressure by choosing to shoot in Argentina. The issues of the handover were nevertheless important: knowing that homosexuals in Hong Kong faced uncertainty after 1997, Wong decided to focus on a relationship between two men. He was keen to present the relationship as ordinary and universal, as he felt Hong Kong's previous LGBT films had not.

Happy Together tells the story of a couple (Tony Leung Chiu-wai and Leslie Cheung) who travel to Buenos Aires in an effort to save their relationship. Wong decided to change the structure and style from his previous films, as he felt he had become predictable. Teo, Brunette, and Jeremy Tambling all see Happy Together as a marked change from his earlier work: the story is more linear and understandable, there are only three characters (with no women at all), and while it still has Doyle's "exuberant" photography, it is more stylistically restrained. After a difficult production period – where a six-week shoot was dragged out to four months – the film was released in May 1997 to great critical acclaim. It competed for the Palme d'Or at the Cannes Film Festival, where Wong became Hong Kong's first winner of the Best Director Award (an achievement he downplayed: "it makes no difference, it’s just something you can put on an ad.")

In his 2005 monograph, Brunette opines that Happy Together marked "a new stage in [Wong's] artistic development", and along with its successor – In the Mood for Love (2000) – showcases the director at "the zenith of his cinematic art." The latter film emerged from a highly complicated production history that lasted two years. Several different titles and projects were planned by Wong before they evolved into the final result: a romantic melodrama set in 1960s Hong Kong that is seen as an unofficial sequel to Days of Being Wild. Wong decided to return to the era that fascinated him, and reflected his own background by focusing on Shanghainese émigrés.

Maggie Cheung and Tony Leung Chiu-wai play the lead characters, who move into an apartment building on the same day in 1962 and discover that their spouses are having an affair; over the next four years they develop a strong attraction. Teo writes that the film is a study of "typical Chinese reserve and repressed desire", while Schneider describes how the "strange relationship" is choreographed with "the grace and rhythm of a waltz" and depicted in "a dreamlike haze by an eavesdropping camera".

The shoot lasted 15 months, with both Cheung and Leung reportedly driven to their breaking points. Wong shot more than 30 times the footage he eventually used, and only finished editing the film the morning before its Cannes premiere. At the festival, In the Mood for Love received the Technical Grand Prize and Best Actor for Leung. It was named Best Foreign Film by the National Society of Film Critics. Wong said after its release: "In the Mood for Love is the most difficult film in my career so far, and one of the most important. I am very proud of it." In subsequent years it has been included on lists of the greatest films of all time.

International work (2001–2007)
While In the Mood for Love took two years to complete, its sequel – 2046 – took double that time. The film was actually conceived first, when Wong picked the title as a reference to the final year of China's "One country, two systems" promise to Hong Kong. Although his plans changed and a new film developed, he simultaneously shot material for 2046, with the first footage dating back to December 1999. Wong immediately continued with the project once In the Mood for Love was complete, reportedly becoming obsessed with it. In Bettinson's account, it "became a behemoth, impossible to finish".

2046 continues the story of Chow Mo-wan, Leung's character from In the Mood for Love, though he is considered much colder and very different. Wong found that he did not want to leave the character, and commenced where he left off in 1966; nevertheless, he claimed: "It's another story, about how a man faces his future due to a certain past". His plans were vague and according to Teo, he set "a new record in his own method of free-thinking, time-extensive and improvisatory filmmaking" with the production. Scenes were shot in Beijing, Shanghai, Hong Kong, Macau, and Bangkok. Actresses Zhang Ziyi and Gong Li were cast to play the women who consume Mo-wan, as the character plans a science fiction novel titled 2046. The film premiered at the 2004 Cannes Film Festival, but Wong delivered the print 24 hours late and still was not happy: he continued editing until the film's October release. It was Wong's most expensive and longest-running project to date. 2046 was a commercial failure in Hong Kong, but the majority of western critics gave it positive reviews. Ty Burr of The Boston Globe praised it as an "enigmatic, rapturously beautiful meditation on romance and remembrance", while Steve Erikson of Los Angeles Magazine called it Wong's masterpiece.

Before starting on his next feature, Wong worked on the anthology film Eros (2004), providing one of three short films (the others directed by Michelangelo Antonioni and Steven Soderbergh) that centre on the theme of lust. Wong's segment, titled The Hand, starred Gong Li as a 1960s call girl and Chang Chen as her potential client. Although Eros was not well received, Wong's segment was often called the most successful.

Following the difficult production of 2046, Wong wanted his next feature to be a simple, invigorating experience. He decided to make an English-language film in America, later justifying this by explaining: "It’s a new landscape. It’s a new background, so it’s refreshing." After hearing a radio interview with the singer Norah Jones he immediately decided to contact her, and she signed on as the lead. Wong's understanding of America was based only on short visits and what he had seen in films, but he was keen to depict the country accurately. As such, he co-wrote the film (one of the rare times a screenplay was pre-prepared) with author Lawrence Block. Titled My Blueberry Nights, it focused on a young New Yorker who leaves for a road trip when she learns that her boyfriend has been unfaithful. Cast as the figures she meets were Jude Law, Natalie Portman, Rachel Weisz and David Strathairn.

Filming on My Blueberry Nights took place over seven weeks in 2006, on location in Manhattan, Memphis, Las Vegas, and Ely, Nevada. Wong produced it in the same manner as he would in Hong Kong, and the themes and visual style – despite Doyle being replaced by cinematographer Darius Khondji – remained the same. Premiering in May 2007, My Blueberry Nights was Wong's fourth consecutive film to compete for the Palme d'Or at Cannes. Although he considered it a "special experience", the film did not receive positive critical reviews. With common complaints that the material was thin and the product uneven, My Blueberry Nights became Wong's first critical failure.

2008–present
Wong's next film was not released for five years, as he underwent another long and difficult production on The Grandmaster (2013) – a biographical film of the martial arts teacher Ip Man. The idea had occurred to him in 1999, but he did not commit to it until the completion of My Blueberry Nights. Ip Man is a legendary figure in Hong Kong, known for training actor Bruce Lee in the art of Wing Chun, but Wong decided to focus on an earlier period of Ip's life (1936–1956) that covered the turmoil of the Second Sino-Japanese War and World War II. He set out to make "a commercial and colourful film". After considerable research and preparation, filming began in 2009. Tony Leung Chui-wai rejoined Wong for their seventh film together, having spent 18 months being trained in Wing Chun. The "gruelling" production lasted intermittently for three years, twice interrupted by Leung fracturing his arm, and is Wong's most expensive to date.

The Grandmaster is described by Bettinson as a mixture of popular and arthouse traditions, with form, visuals, and themes consistent with Wong's previous work. Three different versions of the film exist, as Wong shorted it from its domestic release for the 2013 Berlin Film Festival, and again for its US distribution by the Weinstein Company. Described in Slant Magazine as Wong's most accessible film since his debut, The Grandmaster won twelve Hong Kong Film Awards, including Best Film and Best Director, and received two Academy Award nominations (Cinematography and Production Design). Critics approved of the film, and with a worldwide gross of US$64 million it is Wong's most lucrative film to date.

When asked about his career in 2014, Wong told The Independent, "To be honest with you, I feel I’m only halfway done." In November 2016, he was announced as taking over an upcoming film about the murder of Maurizio Gucci from previous director Ridley Scott, but commented in October 2017 that he was no longer involved in the project. In September 2017, Amazon Video issued a straight-to-series order for Tong Wars, a television drama to be directed by Wong. It focuses on the gang wars that occurred in nineteenth-century San Francisco, but Amazon later dropped the series. Regarding his next film, the Asian media has reported that it will be titled Blossoms Shanghai and based on Jin Yucheng's book of the same name, which focuses on numerous characters in Shanghai from the 1960s to the 2000s. Blossoms Shanghai is also slated to become a web series for Tencent in which Wong produces.

In May 2019, Wong announced the 4K restoration of his entire filmography, which was released in 2021 in celebration of the 20th anniversary of In the Mood for Love. The restoration was carried out by the Cineteca di Bologna's film restoration laboratory L'Immagine Ritrovata. Criterion Collection released Wong's restored filmography as a box set in the United States in March 2021.

Personal life

Wong and his wife, Esther, have one child – a son named Qing. The director is known for always appearing in sunglasses, which James Motram of The Independent says adds "to the alluring sense of mystery that swirls around the man and his movies."

In 2009, Wong signed a petition in support of director Roman Polanski following his arrest in relation to his 1977 sexual abuse charges, who had been detained while traveling to a film festival, which the petition argued would undermine the tradition of film festivals as a place for works to be shown "freely and safely", and that arresting filmmakers traveling to neutral countries could open the door "for actions of which no-one can know the effects."

Filmmaking

Influences

 

Wong is wary of sharing his favourite directors, but has stated that he watched a range of films growing up, from Hong Kong genre films to European art films. They were never labelled as such, and so he approached them equally and was broadly influenced. The energy of the Hong Kong films had a "tremendous" impact according to Brunette. Art professor Giorgio Biancorosso commented that Wong's international influences include Martin Scorsese, Michelangelo Antonioni, Alfred Hitchcock, and Bernardo Bertolucci. Some of his favorite contemporary filmmakers include Scorsese, Christopher Nolan, and Quentin Tarantino. He is often compared with French New Wave director Jean-Luc Godard. Wong's most direct influence was his colleague Patrick Tam, who was an important mentor and likely inspired his use of colour.

Outside of cinema, Wong has been heavily influenced by literature. He has a particular affinity for Latin American writers, and the fragmentary nature of his films came primarily from the "scrapbook structures" of novels by Manuel Puig and Julio Cortázar, which he attempted to emulate. Haruki Murakami, particularly his novel Norwegian Wood, also provided inspiration, as did the writing of Liu Yichang. The television channel MTV was a further influence on Wong. He said in a 1998 interview: "In the late eighties, when [MTV] was first shown in Hong Kong, we were all really impressed with the energy and the fragmented structure. It seemed like we should go in this direction."

Method and collaborators

Wong has an unusual approach to film making, starting production without a script and generally relying on instinct and improvisation rather than pre-prepared ideas. He has said he dislikes writing and finds filming from a finished script "boring". According to Stokes & Hoover, he writes as he shoots, "drawing inspiration from the music, the setting, working conditions, and actors". In advance, the cast are given a minimal plot outline and expected to develop their characters as they film. To capture naturalness and spontaneity, Wong does not allow for rehearsals while improvisation and collaboration are encouraged. He similarly does not use storyboards or plan camera placement, preferring to experiment as he goes. His shooting ratio is therefore very high, sometimes forty takes per scene, and production typically goes well over schedule and over budget. Tony Leung has commented that this approach is "taxing on the actors", but Stokes & Hoover speculate that Wong's collaborators endure it because "[the] results are always unexpected, invigorating, and interesting."

Though Wong admits to being controlling, and oversees every aspect of the film making process, he has formed several long-lasting partnerships and close collaborators. In 2013, he said: "It is always good to work with a very regular group of people because we know how high we can fly and what are the parameters, and it becomes very enjoyable." Two men have been instrumental in developing and achieving his aesthetic: production designer William Chang and cinematographer Christopher Doyle. Chang has worked on every Wong film and is a trusted confidant, responsible for all set design and costuming. Doyle photographed seven of his projects, all from Days of Being Wild to 2046. Stephen Schneider writes that he deserves "much credit" in Wong's success, as his "masterful use of light and colour renders every frame a work of art". Wong's other regular colleagues include writer-producer Jeffrey Lau, producer Jacky Pang, and assistant director Johnnie Kong.

Wong often casts the same actors. He is strongly associated with Tony Leung Chiu-wai, who has appeared in seven of Wong’s feature length films. Wong describes him as a partner, stating, "I feel like there is a lot of things between me and Tony that is beyond words. We don’t need meetings, talks, whatever, because a lot of things are understood." Other actors who have appeared in at least three of his films are Maggie Cheung, Chang Chen, Leslie Cheung, Jacky Cheung, and Carina Lau.

Style

Wong is known for producing art films focussed on mood and atmosphere, rather than following convention. His general style is described by Teo as "a cornucopia overflowing with multiple stories, strands of expression, meanings and identities: a kaleidoscope of colours and identities". Structurally, Wong's films are typically fragmented and disjointed, with little concern for linear narrative, and often with interconnected stories. Critics have commented on the lack of plot in his films, such as Burr who says: "The director doesn't build linear story lines so much as concentric rings of narrative and poetic meaning that continually revolve around each other". Similarly, Brunette says that Wong "often privileges audio/visual expressivity over narrative structure". Wong has commented on this, saying "in my logic there is a storyline."

Key to Wong's films is the visual style, which is often described as beautiful and unique. The colours are bold and saturated, the camerawork swooning, resulting in what Brunette calls his "signature visual pyrotechnics". One of his trademarks is the use of step-printing, which alters film rates to "[liquefy] hard blocks of primary colour into iridescent streaks of light." Other features of the Wong aesthetic include slow motion, off-centre framing, the obscuring of faces, rack focus, filming in the dark or rain, and elliptical editing. Schneider writes of Wong's fondness for "playing with film stock, exposure, and speed the way others might fiddle with a script."

Another trademark of Wong's cinema is his use of music and pop songs. He places great importance on this element, and Biancorosso describes it as the "essence" of his films; a key part of the "narrative machinery" that can guide the rhythm of the editing. He selects international songs, rarely cantopop, and uses them to enhance the sense of history or place. According to film scholar Julian Stringer, music "proved crucial to the emotional and cognitive appeal" of Wong's films.

Wong's dependence on music and his heavily visual and disjointed style has been compared to music videos, but detractors claim that they are "all surface and no depth". Academic Curtis K. Tsui argues that style is the substance in Wong's film, while Brunette believes that his "form remains resolutely in the service of character, theme, and emotion rather than indulged in for its own sake".

Legacy

Wong is an important figure in contemporary cinema, regarded as one of the best filmmakers of his generation. His reputation as a maverick began early in his career: in the 1996 Encyclopedia of Chinese Film, Wong was described as having "already established a secure reputation as one of the most daring avant-garde filmmakers" of Chinese cinema. Authors Zhang and Xiao concluded that he "occupies a special place in contemporary film history", and had already "exerted a sizeable impact". With the subsequent release of Happy Together and In the Mood for Love, Wong's international standing grew further, and in 2002 voters for the British Film Institute named him the third greatest director of the previous quarter-century. In 2015, Variety named him an icon of arthouse cinema.

The East Asian scholar Daniel Martin describes Wong's output as "among the most internationally accessible and critically acclaimed Hong Kong films of all time". Because of this status abroad, Wong is seen as a pivotal figure in his local industry; Julian Stringer says he is "central to the contemporary Chinese cinema renaissance", Gary Bettinson describes him as "a beacon of Hong Kong cinema" who "has kept that industry in the public spotlight", and Film4 designate him the filmmaker from China with the greatest impact. Together with Zhang Yimou, Wong is seen by the historian Philip Kemp as representing the "internationalisation" of East Asian cinema. Domestically, his films were generally not financial successes, but he has been consistently well-awarded by local bodies. From early on, he was regarded as Hong Kong's "enfant terrible" and one of their most iconoclastic filmmakers. Despite this, he has been recognised in both cult and mainstream circles, producing art films that receive commercial exposure. He is known for confounding audiences, as he adopts established genres and subverts them with experimental techniques.

 

Both Stringer and Nochimson claim that Wong has one of the most distinctive filmmaking styles in the industry. From his first film As Tears Go By, he made an impact with his "liquid" aesthetic, which Ungerböck claims was completely new and quickly copied in Asian film and television. His second film, Days of Being Wild, is described by Brunette as "a landmark in Hong Kong cinema" for its unconventional approach. Nochimson writes that Wong's films are entirely personal, making him an auteur, and states, "Wong has developed his own cinematic vocabulary, with an array of shot patterns connected with him". Stringer argues that Wong's success demonstrates the importance of being "different".

Wong's films frequently appeared on best-of lists domestically and internationally. On the Hong Kong Film Awards Association's 2005 list of The Best 100 Chinese Motion Pictures, all except one of his films up to that time made the list. Days of Being Wild (1990) placed at number three, the highest position for a post-1980s film; other films ranked were Chungking Express (22), Ashes of Time (35), As Tears Go By (88), Happy Together (89), and In the Mood for Love (90). In the 2012 Sight & Sound poll, whereby industry professionals submit ballots to determine the greatest films of all time, In the Mood for Love was ranked 24th, the highest-ranked film since 1980 and the sixth greatest film by a living director. Chungking Express and Days of Being Wild both ranked in the top 250; Happy Together and 2046 in the top 500; and Ashes of Time and As Tears Go By also featured (all but two of Wong's films at the time).

Wong's influence has impacted contemporary directors including Quentin Tarantino, Sofia Coppola, Lee Myung-se, Tom Tykwer, Zhang Yuan, Tsui Hark, and Barry Jenkins. In 2018, he was awarded an Honorary Doctor of Arts degree by Harvard University.

Filmography and awards

Wong's oeuvre consists of ten directed features, 16 films where is he credited only as screenwriter, and seven films from other directors that he has produced. He has also directed commercials, short films, and music videos, and contributed to two anthology films. He has received awards and nominations from organisations in Asia, Europe, North America, and South America. In 2006, Wong accepted the National Order of the Legion of Honour: Knight (Lowest Degree) from the French Government. In 2013, he was bestowed with the title of a Commander of the Ordre des Arts et des Lettres, the highest order, by French Foreign Minister Laurent Fabius. The International Film Festival of India gave Wong a Lifetime Achievement Award in 2014.

Notes

References

Sources

External links

Wong Kar-wai at Variety

1958 births
Living people
Cannes Film Festival Award for Best Director winners
César Award winners 
Best Director Asian Film Award winners
European Film Awards winners (people)
Chevaliers of the Légion d'honneur
Commandeurs of the Ordre des Arts et des Lettres
English-language film directors
Film directors from Shanghai
Hong Kong film directors
Hong Kong film producers
Hong Kong screenwriters
Screenwriters from Shanghai
Postmodernist filmmakers